Gregg Hart is an American politician serving as a member of the California State Assembly for the 37th district. Elected in November 2022, he assumed office on December 5, 2022.

Early life and education 
Hart graduated from University of California, Santa Barbara.

Career 
Hart previously worked as the Santa Barbara County Supervisor representing the 2nd Supervisorial District and before that was a member of the Santa Barbara City Council. 

He was elected to the California State Assembly in 2022 after defeating Republican Mike Stoker.

References

External links 
Campaign website
Political office website

Living people
California Democrats
Members of the California State Assembly
University of California, Santa Barbara alumni
Year of birth missing (living people)